Westminster Catechism may refer to:

Westminster Shorter Catechism
Westminster Larger Catechism